Hard-Fussach railway station, also known as Hard-Fußach railway station, is a railway station in the town of Hard, located in the district of Bregenz in the Austrian state of Vorarlberg. It is an intermediate stop on the standard gauge St. Margrethen–Lauterach line of Austrian Federal Railways (ÖBB).

Services 
The following services stop at Hard-Fussach:

References

External links 
 

Railway stations in Vorarlberg
Vorarlberg S-Bahn stations